Limnonectes plicatellus is a species of frog in the family Dicroglossidae. It is found on the Malay Peninsula in Malaysia, Singapore, and southern Peninsular Thailand.
Its natural habitats are small streams; it is associated with swampy puddles in primary and degraded rainforest. It is not considered threatened by the IUCN.

References

External links
Amphibians and Reptiles of Peninsular Malaysia - Limnonectes plicatellus

plicatellus
Amphibians of Malaysia
Amphibians of Singapore
Amphibians of Thailand
Amphibians described in 1873
Taxa named by Ferdinand Stoliczka
Taxonomy articles created by Polbot